Team Lakkapää (formerly Perungan Pojat and Rovaniemen Santasport) is a professional volleyball team from Rovaniemi, Finland. The team played three seasons in Finland volleyball league, the country's highest level. They won two league championships in 2007 and 2008.

Achievements 

 Finland Champion 2007, 2008, 2011
 Finland Cup Champion 2010
 Top-teams cup quarter finals
 Challenge Cup quarter finals

History 

Rovaniemen Santasport was founded in 2006 when volleyball teams Perungan Pojat and Napapiirin Palloketut combined. In its first season the team became Finland league Champion. After that the teams split up. Perungan Pojat became Santasport. In 2008 Santasport won again Championship. Santasport won silver in the last season they played in Finnish volleyball league. After volleyball season 2008/2009 the club's name changed to Perungan Pojat once again.

Eventually they became Team Lakkapää.

Team 

Setters:

 1.  Jani Sippola 
 5.  Kalle Määttä

Middle-blockers

 3.  Antti Ylitalo 
 8.  Viktors Korzenevics

Wing-spikers

 4.  Normunds Veinbergs 
 10.  Robert Seppänen 
 13.  Aki Mikkola 
 14.  Pekka Sairanen

Opposites:

 7.  Joona Manninen
 6. Steve Klosterman
 9. Janne Kangaskokko

Notables 

 Mikko Oivanen
 Normunds Veinbergs
 Ugis Krastins
 Jukka Lehtonen

References 

Finnish volleyball clubs
Rovaniemi